Love, Scott is a Canadian documentary film, directed by Laura Marie Wayne and released in 2018. The film profiles Scott Jones, a gay man who was left paraplegic in an anti-gay attack in 2013.

Background
On October 12, 2013, Jones, a gay resident of New Glasgow, Nova Scotia, was stabbed by a knife-wielding man after leaving the Acro Lounge. His attacker, Shane Matheson, was found guilty and sentenced to 10 years in prison in June 2014. During his recovery, Jones participated in the creation of Don't Be Afraid, a province-wide campaign to combat homophobia, and was selected as the grand marshal of the 2014 Halifax Pride parade.

Film
The film profiles Jones, who is now a music student in Toronto, Ontario, in the present day. The film explores his process of reaching a place of forgiveness, both against his attacker and against the police for declining to prosecute the case as a hate crime, and his desire to create something positive out of his experience by using choral music as a tool of healing and social change education.

The film had its theatrical premiere at BFI Flare: London LGBT Film Festival in March 2018, and had its North American premiere at the Hot Docs Canadian International Documentary Festival in April. It was later screened at the Inside Out Film and Video Festival in May, where it received the Jury Prize for Best Canadian Feature.

References

2018 films
English-language Canadian films
Canadian documentary films
2018 documentary films
Canadian LGBT-related films
2018 LGBT-related films
Documentary films about gay men
Documentary films about violence against LGBT people
2010s English-language films
2010s Canadian films